Oluwasanmi Babafemi Oluwaseu Odelusi (born 11 June 1993) is an English professional footballer who plays as a winger for Hayes & Yeading United.

Club career

Bolton Wanderers
Growing up in Dagenham, England, Odelusi grew up playing football as a sport to enjoy. Odelusi joined Bolton Wanderers in 2009 after having also spent time in the Queens Park Rangers and Reading youth set-ups. It was at Bolton Wanderers when the club's Development Coach Jamie Fullarton helped Odelusi switch position from a striker to a winger.

He spent three years in the reserves but in the 2011–12 season Odelusi scored four goals in 16 league games and was rewarded with one-year deal in July 2012. Upon signing a new contract with the club, Odelusi was given number thirty-eight shirt for the club.

Odelusi was on the bench for the matches against Blackburn Rovers which Bolton won 1–0, the home match against Brighton & Hove Albion and the 1–0 loss against Ipswich Town before eventually making his debut in a 3–2 away loss against Charlton Athletic when he came on for Darren Pratley in the 82nd minute. Odelusi made his first start on 6 August against Shrewsbury Town in the League Cup and scored twice in a 3–1 win. Following his first team appearance, Odelusi signed a new contract with the club, keeping him until 2016. Odelusi made two more appearances later in the 2013–14 season, providing two assists in separate matches against Bournemouth and Reading.

Loan spells
On 21 February 2014, Odelusi joined League One side Milton Keynes Dons on a one-month loan. Odelusi made his MK Dons debut the next day, coming on as a substitute for Luke Chadwick in the 79th minute, in a 1–0 loss against Bradford City. On 24 March 2014, Odelusi extended his loan stay with the Dons until the end of the 2013–14 season. However, Odelusi suffered a knee injury that saw him ruled for the rest of the season before returning to his parent club, where he made ten appearances.

On 31 January 2015, Odelusi joined League One side Coventry City on a loan until the end of the season. On the same day, Odelusi made a strong impact on his debut when he scored from the edge of the area in a 2–2 draw against Rochdale. After being sidelined for weeks due to injury he sustained in training, Odelusi made his first team return, starting in a 1–0 loss against Barnsley on 3 March 2015. Odelusi scored his second Coventry City goal in the next game on 7 March 2015, in a 3–2 loss against Port Vale and scored again two weeks later on 14 March 2015, in a 3–2 win over Chesterfield. Odelusi returned to Bolton after making fourteen appearances and scoring three times for Coventry City.

Wigan Athletic
On 6 July 2015, Odelusi signed for Wigan Athletic on a three-year contract for an undisclosed fee. After making five appearances, three in the league, Odelusi was transfer-listed by Wigan in September 2015.

He was injured in late 2015. Originally ruled out for the 2015/16 season, he returned to playing before the season ended.

Loan to Rochdale
On 25 July 2016, Odelusi joined Rochdale on a season long loan. He scored his first goal for Rochdale in an EFL Trophy tie against Notts County on 4 October 2016.

Loan to Blackpool
On 20 January 2017 he had his loan spell with Rochdale terminated after making just fifteen league appearances and parent club Wigan immediately loaned him out to Football League Two side Blackpool for the remainder of the season.

Colchester United
On 31 August 2017, Odelusi signed for Colchester United until January 2018. He made his Colchester debut on 2 September as a substitute in their 1–0 defeat at Cambridge United. He made his full debut on 3 October in Colchester's 1–0 home defeat by Gillingham in the EFL Trophy. He was replaced by Craig Slater after 78-minutes of the match. He scored his first goal for Colchester on 25 November during a 2–1 defeat at Notts County. He was told his contract would not be renewed when it expired on 31 December 2017 and was allowed to attend a trial at Cheltenham Town.

Cheltenham Town
Odelusi signed a contract with Chelthenham Town on 5 January 2018. On 10 May 2018, it was announced that Odelusi would leave Cheltenham at the end of his current deal in June 2018.

Halifax Town
On 4 June 2018, Odelusi signed for National League side Halifax Town.

South Shields
He signed for South Shields on 1 October 2019, initially until January 2020.

Hayes and Yeading United
Odelusi signed for Hayes and Yeading United from Romford in February 2020.

Coaching career
On 31 December 2019, Odelusi announced his retirement from football to pursue a career as a coach. Shortly afterwards he signed for Romford appearing to reverse this situation.

Career statistics

References

External links
 Sanmi Odelusi profile at the official Colchester United F.C. website
 

1993 births
Living people
Footballers from Dagenham
English people of Nigerian descent
Black British sportspeople
English footballers
Association football forwards
Bolton Wanderers F.C. players
Milton Keynes Dons F.C. players
Coventry City F.C. players
Wigan Athletic F.C. players
Rochdale A.F.C. players
Blackpool F.C. players
Colchester United F.C. players
Cheltenham Town F.C. players
FC Halifax Town players
South Shields F.C. (1974) players
Romford F.C. players
Hayes & Yeading United F.C. players
English Football League players
National League (English football) players
Northern Premier League players
Isthmian League players
Southern Football League players